The H4 was Honda's first 4-speed automatic transmission.  It is distinguished from the later H4A by its use of two rather than three shafts.

Applications:
 1983 Honda Accord (AK)
 1983–1985 Honda Prelude (AS)
 1984–1985 Honda Accord (AS)
 1985–1987 Honda Prelude (F4)
 1986–1989 Honda Accord (F4)
 1986–1987 Honda Civic (CA)
 1986–1987 Honda CRX (CA)
 1986–1987 Acura Integra (CA)
 1988–1989 Honda Prelude (K4)
 1988–1989 Acura Integra (P1)
 1989–1990 Honda Civic (S5)
 1990–1991 Honda Prelude (PY8A)

See also
 List of Honda transmissions

H4
Automatic transmission tradenames